As of April 2021, SkyUp operates scheduled and charter flights to the following destinations:

Destinations

References

Skyup